Baron Tweedsmuir, of Elsfield in the County of Oxford, is a title in the Peerage of the United Kingdom. It was created in 1935 for the author and Unionist politician John Buchan. He served as Governor-General of Canada from 1935 to his death in 1940. His eldest son, the second Baron, was the husband of the Conservative politician Lady Tweedsmuir.  the title is held by the second Baron's nephew, the fourth Baron, who succeeded his father in 2008.

The Honourable James Buchan, younger son of the third Baron, is an author.

The first Baron was brought up in the Tweed Valley in the Scottish Borders at Broughton close to the village of Tweedsmuir.

The family seat was Elsfield Manor, near Oxford.

Barons Tweedsmuir (1935)
John Buchan, 1st Baron Tweedsmuir (1875–1940)
John Norman Stuart Buchan, 2nd Baron Tweedsmuir (1911–1996)
William de l'Aigle Buchan, 3rd Baron Tweedsmuir (1916–2008)
John William de l'Aigle Buchan, 4th Baron Tweedsmuir (b. 1950)

The heir apparent is the present holder's son the Hon. John Alasdair Gawain Buchan (b. 1986).

References

Kidd, Charles, Williamson, David (editors). Debrett's Peerage and Baronetage (1990 edition). New York: St Martin's Press, 1990.

Baronies in the Peerage of the United Kingdom
Noble titles created in 1935
Noble titles created for UK MPs